The Choice School is a private school in Kerala, India, built in 1991. It is owned by The Choice Group under the leadership of Jose Thomas Olassa. The school follows CBSE syllabus. It consists over 2200 students and 250 staff members. The school is attended by both day scholars as well as boarding school students.

Principals 

 Mrs. Lakshmi Ramachandran (1991-1999), Mentor of Global Public School                *Mrs. Laila Thomas (1999-2000)
 Mrs. Molly Cyril (2000-2013)
 Mrs. Sunitha Satheesh (2013-2020)
 Mr. Jacob P. Ajith Mathews (2020-2022)

See also
 List of schools in Ernakulam district

References

External links
 

Private schools in Kochi
Boarding schools in Kerala
Educational institutions established in 1991
1991 establishments in Kerala